This article presents a list of the historical events and publications of Australian literature during 1964.

Major publications

Books 

 Russell Braddon – The Year of the Angry Rabbit
 A. Bertram Chandler – The Deep Reaches of Space
 Jon Cleary
 The Fall of an Eagle
 A Flight of Chariots
 Charmian Clift – Honour's Mimic
 Dymphna Cusack – Black Lightning
 George Johnston – My Brother Jack
 Thomas Keneally – The Place at Whitton
 David Rowbotham – The Man in the Jungle
 Judah Waten – Distant Land

Short stories 

 Nancy Cato – The Sea Ants and Other Stories
 A. Bertram Chandler – Into the Alternate Universe : The Coils of Time
 Peter Cowan – "The Tractor"
 Damien Broderick – "All My Yesterdays"
 Frank Dalby Davison – The Road to Yesterday : Collected Short Stories
 Patrick White – The Burnt Ones

Children's and Young Adult fiction 

 Hesba Brinsmead – Pastures of the Blue Crane
 Nan Chauncy – High and Haunted Island
 Ruth Park
 Airlift for Grandee
 The Muddle-Headed Wombat on Holiday

Poetry 

 Bruce Dawe – "How to Go On Not Looking"
 A. D. Hope – "An Epistle : Edward Sackville to Venetia Digby"
 T. Inglis Moore – From the Ballads to Brennan
 Oodgeroo Noonuccal – We Are Going : Poems
 Peter Porter – "Sydney Cove, 1788"
 David Rowbotham – All the Room
 Thomas Shapcott – The Mankind Thing
 Vivian Smith – "Late April : Hobart"
 Douglas Stewart – Modern Australian Verse
 Randolph Stow – "Ishmael"
 Francis Webb – The Ghost of the Cock : Poems

Non-fiction 

 Donald Horne – The Lucky Country
 Douglas Lockwood – Up the Track

Drama 

 Frank Hardy – The Ringbolter
 David Ireland – Image in the Clay
 Patrick White – Night on Bald Mountain

Awards and honours

Literary

Children and Young Adult

Poetry

Births 

A list, ordered by date of birth (and, if the date is either unspecified or repeated, ordered alphabetically by surname) of births in 1964 of Australian literary figures, authors of written works or literature-related individuals follows, including year of death.

 7 May – Elliot Perlman, novelist
 21 July – Gillian Mears, novelist (died 2016)
 7 August – John Birmingham, novelist and journalist
 10 August – Heather Rose, novelist
 28 August – Traci Harding, science fiction and fantasy novelist

Unknown date

 Jonathan Strahan, editor and anthologist

Deaths 

A list, ordered by date of death (and, if the date is either unspecified or repeated, ordered alphabetically by surname) of deaths in 1964 of Australian literary figures, authors of written works or literature-related individuals follows, including year of birth.

 22 January – Zora Cross, poet (born 1890)
 12 February – Arthur Upfield, novelist (born 1890)
 1 May – Ethel Nhill Victoria Stonehouse, novelist and poet (born 1883)
 19 October – Nettie Palmer, critic and journalist (born 1885)

See also 
 1964 in Australia
 1964 in literature
 1964 in poetry
 List of years in Australian literature
 List of years in literature

References

 
Australian literature by year
20th-century Australian literature
1964 in literature